George Creek is a stream in the U.S. state of Washington. It is a tributary of Asotin Creek.

George Creek was named after a local Indian named George who used the area as hunting ground.

See also
List of rivers of Washington

References

Rivers of Asotin County, Washington
Rivers of Washington (state)